National Tertiary Route 315, or just Route 315 (or ) is a National Road Route of Costa Rica, located in the San José, Cartago provinces.

Description
In San José province the route covers Dota canton (Santa María, Copey districts).

In Cartago province the route covers El Guarco canton (San Isidro district).

References

Highways in Costa Rica